The 1988 Eagle Aloha Bowl was a college football bowl game, the fourth of seventeen in the bowl season of the 1988 NCAA Division I-A football season. The seventh edition of the Aloha Bowl, it was played on December 25 at Aloha Stadium in Honolulu, Hawaii.

Underdog Washington State scored all of its points in the second quarter and forced a last-second Houston turnover in notching a  win on  The bowl appearance was Washington State's second of the 1980s and was the first bowl victory for Washington State since the   This was the final game for head coach  at WSU; he left for the University of Miami 

Washington State climbed up to sixteenth in the final AP poll, and Houston dropped

Scoring
First quarter
Houston – Roman Anderson 27-yard field goal (13:13). 3-0 UH

Second quarter
WSU – Victor Wood 5-yard fumble run (Jason Hanson kick). (13:39). 7-3 WSU
WSU – Wood 15-yard pass from Timm Rosenbach (Hanson kick). (8:39). 14-3 WSU
WSU – Hanson 33-yard field goal (6:31), 17-3 WSU
Houston – Chuck Weatherspoon 1-yard run (kick failed), (4:56), 17-9 WSU
WSU – Rosenbach 1-yard run (Hanson kick), (0:53), 24-9 WSU

Third quarter
Houston – Kevin Mason 53-yard pass from David Dacus (pass failed), (4:25), 24-15 WSU

Fourth quarter
Houston – Weatherspoon 2-yard pass from Dacus (Anderson kick), (13:16), 24-22 WSU

Statistics
{| class=wikitable style="text-align:center"
! Statistics !! WashingtonState !!   Houston  
|-
|align=left|First Downs || 23 || 13
|-
|align=left|Rushes–yards|| 56–154 || 21–68
|-
|align=left|Passing yards || 306 || 241
|-
|align=left|Passes (C–A–I) || 19–36–1 ||  17–40–2
|-
|align=left|Total yards||460 || 309
|-
|align=left|Fumbles–lost ||2–1 || 2–1
|-
|align=left|Turnovers by ||2 || 3
|-
|align=left|Punts–average || 6–46.0 || 8–45.4
|-
|align=left|Penalties–yards || 11–95 || 9–58
|-
|align=left|Time of possession || 37:43 || 22:17
|}

References

Aloha Bowl
Aloha Bowl
Houston Cougars football bowl games
Washington State Cougars football bowl games
Aloha
December 1988 sports events in the United States